Elections are held every four years in the off-year immediately after US presidential election years in Overland Park, Kansas to elect the city's mayor. Elections for city officials in Johnson County are held on the first Tuesday after the first Monday in November. If more than two candidates file to run for office, a primary must be held on the first Tuesday in August.

1997

The 1997 Overland Park, Kansas mayoral election was held on April 1, 1997. Incumbent mayor, Ed Eilert, ran against Max Gordon and was elected to a fifth term in office.

General election

Candidates
Ed Eilert, incumbent mayor
Max Gordon

Results

2001

The 2001 Overland Park, Kansas mayoral election was held on April 3, 2001. Incumbent mayor, Ed Eilert, ran unopposed and was elected to his sixth term in office.

General election

Candidates
Ed Eilert, incumbent mayor

Results

2005

The 2005 Overland Park, Kansas mayoral election was held on April 5, 2005. Incumbent mayor, Ed Eilert, who had served in the office since 1981, chose not to run for another term. This election saw Overland Park City Council member, Carl R. Gerlach, elected as mayor, defeating Neil Sader.

General election

Candidates
Only two candidates ran for this election, so a primary was not held.

Carl R. Gerlach, Overland Park City Council member
Neil S. Sader

Results

2009

The 2009 Overland Park, Kansas mayoral election was held on April 7, 2009. Incumbent Carl R. Gerlach ran unopposed and was elected to a second term in office.

General election

Candidates
Carl R. Gerlach, incumbent mayor

Results

2013

The 2013 Overland Park, Kansas mayoral election was held on April 2, 2013. Incumbent Carl R. Gerlach ran unopposed and was elected to a third term in office.

General election

Candidates
Carl R. Gerlach, incumbent mayor

Results

2017

The 2017 Overland Park, Kansas mayoral election was held on November 7, 2017. This election saw the first challenger to incumbent mayor, Carl R. Gerlach, since 2005. He ultimately was elected to a fourth term in office.

General election

Candidates
Carl R. Gerlach, incumbent mayor
Charlotte O’Hara

Results

2021

The 2021 Overland Park, Kansas mayoral election was an election for the office of mayor of Overland Park, Kansas. Incumbent Carl R. Gerlach did not run for re-election.

Gerlach and another former Overland Park mayor, Ed Eilert, endorsed Curt Skoog.

Primary election

Candidates

Curt Skoog, Overland Park City Council member for Ward 2
Dr. Faris Farassati, Overland Park City Council member
Clay Norkey
Mike Czinege, retired AMC Theatres executive

Results

General election
Mike Czinege and Curt Skoog received the most votes in the primary, allowing them to appear on the ballot in the general election on November 2, 2021. Skoog beat Czinege in a tight race, by 731 votes.

Candidates
Curt Skoog
Mike Czinege

Results

References